Zhang Ming (born June 1957) is a Chinese diplomat.

Zhang was born in Zhengzhou, Henan Province. He graduated from the Faculty of Asian and African Languages of Beijing Foreign Studies University with a bachelor's degree. Zhang began his career in 1975 and joined the Communist Party of China in 1983. In 2001, he became Deputy Director-General of the General Office of the Ministry of Foreign Affairs. In 2006, he became Ambassador to Kenya, Permanent Representative to UNEP and Permanent Representative to UN-Habitat. In 2009, he became Director-General of the Department of African Affairs of the MFA. In 2010, he became Director-General of the General Office of the MFA. In 2011, he became Assistant Minister of Foreign Affairs in charge of the general office, staff, and archival work. In December 2013, he became Vice Minister of Foreign Affairs.

In October 2017, he became Ambassador to the European Union. In his role as ambassador, he was reportedly perceived as "an old-school diplomat", not a "wolf warrior". In January 2018, he was chosen as a member of the 13th National Committee of the Chinese People's Political Consultative Conference. In 2021, during his farewell speech as Ambassador to the EU, Zhang advocated cooperation, multilateralism, and better communication in China–EU relations.

In January 2022, he became Secretary-General of the Shanghai Cooperation Organisation.

References 

Living people
Ambassadors of China to the European Union
Members of the 13th Chinese People's Political Consultative Conference
Vice-ministers of the Ministry of Foreign Affairs of the People's Republic of China
Ambassadors of China to Kenya
Chinese Communist Party politicians
Beijing Foreign Studies University alumni
People from Baoding
1957 births